James Noble (December 16, 1785 – February 26, 1831) was the first U.S. Senator from the U.S. state of Indiana.

Noble was born near Berryville, Virginia, and moved with his parents to Campbell County, Kentucky, when he was 10. There he studied law and he became an attorney, after which he moved to Indiana and settled in Brookville around 1808.

Once settled in Indiana he became a ferryboat operator, a judge and a member of the state's first constitutional convention, in 1816, as a delegate from Franklin County.

He was elected to the first session of the Indiana State House of Representatives in 1816.

He was elected as a Crawford faction Democratic Republican (later an anti-Jacksonian Democrat) to the United States Senate in 1816. He was reelected to two more terms and served from December 11, 1816, until his death in 1831.

While in the Senate he was chairman of the U.S. Senate Committee on Pensions for the 15th, 16th, 17th, 18th and 20th Congresses, and chairman of the U.S. Committee on the Militia for the 16th and 17th Congresses.

He died in Washington, D.C., and is buried in the Congressional Cemetery.

See also
List of United States Congress members who died in office (1790–1899)

External links

Delegates to the 1816 Constitutional Convention

1785 births
1831 deaths
Members of the Indiana House of Representatives
United States senators from Indiana
Burials at the Congressional Cemetery
Delegates to the 1816 Indiana constitutional convention
Indiana Democratic-Republicans
Indiana National Republicans
19th-century American politicians
Democratic-Republican Party United States senators
National Republican Party United States senators
People from Berryville, Virginia
People from Brookville, Indiana